Tredrizzick is a small village in Cornwall, England, United Kingdom, at . It is on the road linking the villages of Rock and St Minver.

References

Villages in Cornwall